Justice O'Hara may refer to:

Joseph W. O'Hara, temporary associate justice of the Ohio Supreme Court
Michael D. O'Hara, associate justice of the Michigan Supreme Court